Colonel Samuel Reber, Sr. (October 16, 1864 – April 16, 1933) was an aviation pioneer in the Signal Corps.

He was born on October 16, 1864 in Missouri. Reber attended the United States Military Academy and graduated on July 1, 1882. He was promoted to second lieutenant in the 4th Cavalry Regiment on July 1, 1886. John J. Pershing, along with Charles T. Menoher, George B. Duncan, Julius Penn, and several others, were among his classmates. He married Cecilia Sherman Miles, the daughter of General Nelson Appleton Miles and Mary Hoyt Sherman, on January 10, 1900 in Washington, D.C. They had as their son, Samuel Reber, Jr.

He died on April 16, 1933. He was buried in Arlington National Cemetery on April 16, 1933.

References

1864 births
1933 deaths
Burials at Arlington National Cemetery
United States Military Academy alumni
United States Army colonels
United States Army personnel of World War I
United States Army Cavalry Branch personnel
United States Army Signal Corps personnel
Military personnel from Missouri